This is a list of countries by net migration rate, the difference between the number of persons entering and leaving a country during the year, per 1,000 persons (based on midyear population).

Method 
An excess of persons entering the country is referred to as net immigration (e.g., 3.56 migrants/1,000 population); an excess of persons leaving the country as net emigration (e.g., -9.26 migrants/1,000 population). The net migration rate indicates the contribution of migration to the overall level of population change. The net migration rate does not distinguish between economic migrants, refugees, and other types of migrants; nor does it dis        l migrants and unlawful migrants.

Data

United Nations

World Bank (2012)

Countries and territories

Regions

The World Factbook by CIA 

2022 estimates.

References

External links
Net migration. Worldbank.

Demographic lists
Net Migration Rate
Human migration
Migration rate